Oldendorf-Himmelpforten is a Samtgemeinde ("collective municipality") in the district of Stade, in Lower Saxony, Germany. It was formed on 1 January 2014 by the merger of the former Samtgemeinden Oldendorf and Himmelpforten. Its seat is in the village Himmelpforten.

The Samtgemeinde Oldendorf-Himmelpforten consists of the following municipalities:
Burweg 
Düdenbüttel 
Engelschoff 
Estorf 
Großenwörden 
Hammah 
Heinbockel 
Himmelpforten
Kranenburg 
Oldendorf

Samtgemeinden in Lower Saxony